Fernando Delgado Guerrero (born 1 August 2001) is a Spanish footballer who plays as a central midfielder for RSC Internacional FC.

Club career
Born in Madrid, Guerrero represented Colegio Vallmont, Las Rozas CF and CF Rayo Majadahonda as a youth. On 2 December 2018, aged just 17, he made his professional debut by starting in a 0–0 home draw against Deportivo de La Coruña, in the Segunda División championship.

On 18 January 2019, Guerrero renewed his contract until 2021. On 28 June, Real Madrid reached an agreement with Rayo Majadahonda for the transfer of Guerrero; he initially returned to the youth setup.

On 8 September 2020, after finishing his formation, Guerrero was loaned to Segunda División B side Barakaldo CF for the season. The following 27 August, he moved to CF Fuenlabrada also in a temporary deal, being initially assigned to the reserves in Tercera División RFEF.

References

External links
Real Madrid profile

2001 births
Living people
Footballers from Madrid
Spanish footballers
Association football midfielders
Segunda División players
Segunda División B players
Tercera Federación players
CF Rayo Majadahonda players
Real Madrid Castilla footballers
Barakaldo CF footballers
CF Fuenlabrada B players